Alexius was a metropolitan bishop of Nicaea who composed a Canon or Hymn about Saint Demetrius of Thessaloniki. It is uncertain when he lived.  The canon is in manuscript.

References

Eastern Orthodox metropolitans
Byzantine writers
Bishops of Nicaea